Lachnostylis is a genus of the family Phyllanthaceae first described as a genus in 1846. It is native to the Eastern Cape and the Western Cape Provinces of South Africa. It is often included in Savia. It is dioecious, with male and female flowers on separate plants.

Species
 Lachnostylis bilocularis R.A.Dyer 
 Lachnostylis hirta (L.f.) Müll.Arg.

References

Phyllanthaceae
Phyllanthaceae genera
Flora of the Cape Provinces
Endemic flora of South Africa
Taxa named by Nikolai Turczaninow
Dioecious plants